Muqu Wasi (Quechua muqu hill, wasi house, "hill house", Hispanicized spelling Mojo Huasi) is a mountain in the Andes of Peru, about  high. It is situated in the Ayacucho Region, Cangallo Province, Totos District, northeast of Totos. Muqu Wasi lies west of Kiswara, east of  Huch'uy Puka Q'asa and southeast of Chawpi Urqu.

References

Mountains of Peru
Mountains of Ayacucho Region